'Think of England' was released in 2009 as the first single to be taken from IAMX's third studio album 'Kingdom of Welcome Addiction'.  The single introduced fans to a heavier, rockier sound than had previously been heard.  It was initially made available for free download via a special website before being released as a limited edition self-release in the UK and on the Metropolis Records label in the US.

Music video
The music video, which was directed by Michel Briegel, incorporates footage of Chris performing live onstage with his band in Graz, Austria on 13 December 2008 and in Prague, Czech Republic the following night.

Track listing
UK Limited Edition

US release

IAMX songs
2009 songs
Songs written by Chris Corner